Robert V. Callahan (April 11, 1937 – December 26, 2020) is a former politician from Ontario, Canada. He served as a Liberal member of the Legislative Assembly of Ontario from 1985 to 1995 representing the ridings of Brampton and Brampton South. From 1969 to 1985, and from 1997 to 2014 he served as a Brampton city councillor.

Background
Callahan was born and raised in South Bronx, New York City. His family left for Canada when he was 17.

Callahan has a Bachelor of Arts degree from the University of Toronto and a law degree from Osgoode Hall at York University. He operated a private legal practice in Toronto from 1965 to 1966, when he joined the firm of Beatty, Bowyer & Greenslade in Brampton.  In 1969, he became a partner in the Brampton firm of Cook, Callahan & Leschied. Following the departure of partners Cooke and Leschied in 1982 and 1989, he continued in private practice. Callahan lives in Brampton with his wife Lyn. Together they raised four boys and have four grandchildren.

Brampton City Council
Callahan served as an alderman on the Brampton City Council from 1969 to 1985, representing Ward 3.

Provincial politics
He ran for the Ontario legislature in the 1977 provincial election, but finished third against Progressive Conservative Bill Davis, the sitting Premier, the riding of Brampton.  He challenged Davis again in the 1981 election, and finished a distant second.

33rd Parliament, MPP for Brampton (1985-1987)

Bill Davis retired from the legislature in early 1985, and Callahan was able to win the Brampton seat on his third effort. In the provincial election of 1985, the Progressive Conservatives under Frank Miller were reduced to a minority government as Liberal support increased in much of the province. Callahan defeated PC candidate Jeff Rice in Brampton by over 4,000 votes, and became a backbench supporter of David Peterson's Liberal government after Miller's ministry was defeated in the legislature.

Roles

During this term, Callahan served in a variety of roles:

 Chair, Standing Committee on Regulations and Private Bills, May 27, 1987 — July 31, 1987
 Member, Standing Committee on Social Development, May 4, 1987 — July 31, 1987
 Member, Standing Committee on Regulations and Private Bills, May 4, 1987 — July 31, 1987
 Member, Standing Committee on Public Accounts, May 4, 1987 — July 31, 1987
 Member, Select Committee on Health, May 4, 1987 — July 31, 1987
 Member, Standing Committee on Social Development, February 12, 1987 — April 28, 1987
 Member, Standing Committee on Public Accounts, October 29, 1986 — April 28, 1987
 Member, Select Committee on Health, July 10, 1986 — April 28, 1987
 Chair, Select Committee on Health, July 10, 1986 — April 28, 1987
 Chair, Standing Committee on Regulations and Private Bills, May 14, 1986 — April 28, 1987
 Member, Standing Committee on Regulations and Private Bills, April 28, 1986 — April 28, 1987
 Member, Standing Committee on Administration of Justice, October 15, 1986 — October 29, 1986
 Member, Standing Committee on Administration of Justice, April 28, 1986 — July 10, 1986
 Member, Standing Committee on Resources Development, February 12, 1986 — April 22, 1986
 Chair, Standing Committee on Regulations and Private Bills, July 10, 1985 — April 22, 1986
 Member, Standing Committee on Administration of Justice, July 10, 1985 — April 22, 1986
 Member, Select Committee on Health, July 10, 1985 — February 12, 1986
 Chair, Select Committee on Health, July 10, 1985 — February 12, 1986

34th Parliament, MPP for Brampton South (1987-1990)

The Liberals won a landslide re-election victory in the 1987 provincial election, and Callahan defeated his nearest opponent by over 11,000 votes in the redistributed riding of Brampton South.  He was not appointed to cabinet, and remained in the backbenches. He chaired the Public Accounts Committee of the Legislative Assembly, which studied alcohol and drug addiction, and treatment. The Ottawa Citizen noted that he was suited to the role, given his exposure to the issue; he believed that 75% of those jailed had substance issues. He advocated for the funding of treatment, telling the Citizen "It's kind of like the mechanic said. You can 'pay me now' by treating them 'or pay me later' by putting them in jail or putting up with crime and family breakdown."

Roles

During this term, Callahan served in a variety of roles:

 Member, Select Committee on Energy, December 20, 1989 — July 30, 1990
 Chair, Standing Committee on Regulations and Private Bills, October 18, 1989 — July 30, 1990
 Member, Standing Committee on Regulations and Private Bills, October 11, 1989 — July 30, 1990
 Chair, Standing Committee on Administration of Justice, May 9, 1989 — October 11, 1989
 Member, Standing Committee on Administration of Justice, May 8, 1989 — October 11, 1989
 Member, Standing Committee on General Government, May 8, 1989 — October 11, 1989
 Member, Standing Committee on General Government, October 24, 1988 — April 25, 1989
 Chair, Standing Committee on Administration of Justice, December 1, 1987 — April 25, 1989
 Member, Standing Committee on Administration of Justice, November 23, 1987 — April 25, 1989

35th Parliament, MPP for Brampton (1990-1995)

The New Democratic Party won a majority government in the 1990 provincial election, and the Liberals were reduced to only 36 MPPs.  Callahan was one of these, defeating NDP challenger John Scheer by 424 votes.  In 1992, he was appointed as his party's critic for Correctional Services.

In 1993, Callahan was a vocal opponent of the NDP government's plans to prohibit the picketing of abortion clinics within Ontario.

Roles

During this term, Callahan served in a variety of roles:

 Member, Standing Committee on Public Accounts, April 20, 1993 — April 28, 1995
 Critic, Correctional Services, March 6, 1992 — April 28, 1995
 Member, Standing Committee on Public Accounts, April 14, 1992 — April 13, 1993
 Chair, Standing Committee on Public Accounts, December 6, 1990 — April 6, 1992
 Member, Standing Committee on Public Accounts, November 28, 1990 — April 6, 1992

1995 defeat
In the 1995 provincial election, the Progressive Conservative Party under Mike Harris won a majority government based primarily on support from Greater Toronto Area communities such as Brampton. Callahan lost his own seat to PC candidate Tony Clement, later a provincial cabinet minister and a candidate for the leadership of the Conservative Party of Canada.

Return to city council
Callahan returned to municipal politics after his defeat, and was re-elected for Ward 3 on the Brampton City Council in 1997.  He was re-elected up until 2010. He decided to retire from politics and did not put his name forward for the 2014 municipal election.

References

External links

Living people
1937 births
American emigrants to Canada
Lawyers in Ontario
Ontario Liberal Party MPPs
Ontario municipal councillors
Politicians from Brampton